Diana Quijano Valdivieso (born April 12, 1962) is a Peruvian actress and model.

Filmography

Television
 Parientes a la fuerza (Telemundo, 2021 ) as Michelle Bonnet
 La Hija Prodiga (TV Azteca, 2017-2018) As Matilde Salamanca.
 Nuestra Historia (TV PERU, 2015) As Ivette.
 De Millonario a Mendigo (IMIZU PRODUCCIONES,2015) As Ivett del Carpio.
 Tierra de reyes (Telemundo, 2014) as Beatriz “La Nena” Alcazar de la Fuente.
 Dama y obrero (2013) as Gina Perez
 Niñas mal 2 (MTV Latinoamérica, 2013) as Macarena de la Fuente.
 La Prepago (Sony - 2012) as Lia Rochel
 Los herederos del Monte (Telemundo, 2011) as Sofía Cañadas.
 Niñas mal (MTV Latinoamérica, 2010) as Maca.
 Bella calamidades (Telemundo, 2009) as Regina de Galeano.
 Victoria (Telemundo, 2007-2008) as Camila Matiz.
 Sin Vergüenza (Telemundo, 2007) as Memé del Solar.
 Al Son del Amor (WAPA-TV, 2005) as Silvia.
 Prisionera (Telemundo, 2004) as Lucero "Lulú" de Ríobueno.
 Gata Salvaje (Venevisión, 2002) as Sonia.
 Secreto de amor (Venevisión, 2001) as Isolda García.
 La Revancha (Venevisión, 2000) as Lucía Arciniegas.
 Morelia (Televisa, 1995) as Alexa Ramírez "La Gata".
 Guadalupe (Telemundo, 1993-1994) as Drogadicta.
 Mala mujer (Frecuencia Latina, 1991) as Silvia Rivasplata.
 El hombre que debe morir (Panamericana Televisión, 1989) as Esther Keller.
 No hay por quien llorar (1988) as Secretaria.

Theatre 
 "Vanya Y Sonya Y Masha Y Spike (2015-2016) Plan 9.
 "Te comió la lengua el Ratón" (2015)  Microteatro como Morgana.
 Tr3s (2014) como Rocio Moreno
 Que Depresion Post Parto ni que Carajo (2014) Monologo
 Un Tranvia llamado Deseo (2013) Blanche Dubois
  Ocho Mujeres(2012) as Pierrette.
 Carmín, el Musical (2011) as Claudia Menchelli
 La Lechuga (2002-2003) as Virginia
 El tio Mauricio (2001) as Bailarina.
 Daniela Frank, libreto para una función clandestina (1993) como Daniela
 Pataclaun en la ciudad (1992) como MUDA.
 Cronicas Imakinarias (1991) as Coreografo/Bailarina.
 Catherine et l'armoire (1991) as MUTANTE FEMENINO.
 Sexus (1989) as Coreografias bailarina.
 Acero Inoxidable (1987) as Coreografias y Teatro Danza "Bailarina".
 Nina de ningunos ojos (1985) as Creación Colectiva "La niña del cuento".

Film  
 Cuatro Altares (2018) Director Alonso del Río, as “Bertha Stein”
 Forgiveness (2018) Director Alex Kahaum, “as The Keeper”
 La Fundación de Lucía (2018) Director Gabriel Reyes, as Art Critic
 South Beach Dreams (2006) Director Errol Falcon, as Felicia Torres.
 Zona de Miedo (2006) Director Pamela Yates   Documental-Narracion.
 Los Díaz de Doris (1999) Director Abdiel Colbert, como Amneris López.
 Cotidiano 1992 Director Marité Ugaz  as la mujer.
 La manzanita del diablo (1990) as La Gata.
 Fire in the Amazon (1991) Journalist.
 Furias (1991) as La Amante.
 Raquel (1991) as Raquel.
 Se sienten pasos (1991) as Ladrona.
 Welcome to Oblivium (1990) as Radio.
 Crime Zone (1989) as PoliceWoman 2.

Health issues
On June 29, 2022, Quijano publicly disclosed that she was diagnosed with breast cancer.

References

External links

1962 births
Living people
People from Lima
Peruvian female models
Peruvian film actresses
Peruvian stage actresses
Peruvian telenovela actresses
20th-century Peruvian actresses
21st-century Peruvian actresses
Actresses from Lima